Mirjana Lazarova Trajkovska (born 11 May 1963) is a Macedonian judge born in Strumica, Macedonia. She was the judge of the European Court of Human Rights in respect of North-Macedonia from 2008 to 2017.

References

1963 births
Living people
People from Strumica
Macedonian judges
Judges of the European Court of Human Rights
Women judges
Macedonian judges of international courts and tribunals